Merwin  Dam (also known as Ariel Dam) is a concrete arch gravity-type hydroelectric dam on the Lewis River, in the U.S. state of Washington. It is located on the border between Cowlitz County and Clark County. Its reservoir is called Lake Merwin.

On November 24, 1971, the dam was fully lit allegedly giving the skyjacker D. B. Cooper an identifiable landmark when he jumped from a Boeing 727 passenger liner. Cooper had ransomed 200,000 dollars from Federal Authorities after holding hostage the 727 and its passengers in Seattle.

References

Dams in Washington (state)
PacifiCorp dams
Hydroelectric power plants in Washington (state)
Buildings and structures in Cowlitz County, Washington
Buildings and structures in Clark County, Washington
Dams completed in 1931
Energy infrastructure completed in 1931
Energy infrastructure completed in 1949
Energy infrastructure completed in 1958
Dams on the Lewis River (Washington)